Heritage High School (HHS) is a public secondary school located in Ringgold, Georgia, United States. It is in the Catoosa County Public Schools district.

Heritage High School was founded in 2008. It was the first high school opened by Catoosa County in three decades. The school's cost was $42.5 million. It was founded to alleviate the overcrowding at Lakeview-Fort Oglethorpe High School and Ringgold High School. Heritage High School is the "Home of the Generals." It has 72 classrooms.

It also has a number of GHSA-recognized sports such as football,  wrestling, baseball, cheerleading, cross country, golf, softball, swimming, basketball, tennis, soccer, volleyball, track.

Notable alumni

 Cole Wilcox - professional baseball player

Reference List

External links
 

Schools in Catoosa County, Georgia
Educational institutions established in 2008
Public high schools in Georgia (U.S. state)
2008 establishments in Georgia (U.S. state)